Ganjevan or Ganjavan or Gonjevan may refer to:
 Ganjevan, Ilam
 Ganjavan, Isfahan
 Ganjavan, Kermanshah